A resistor–inductor circuit (RL circuit), or RL filter or RL network, is an electric circuit composed of resistors and inductors driven by a voltage or current source. A first-order RL circuit is composed of one resistor and one inductor, either in series driven by a voltage source or in parallel driven by a current source. It is one of the simplest analogue infinite impulse response electronic filters.

Introduction
The fundamental passive linear circuit elements are the resistor (R), capacitor (C) and inductor (L). These circuit elements can be combined to form an electrical circuit in four distinct ways: the RC circuit, the RL circuit, the LC circuit and the RLC circuit, with the abbreviations indicating which components are used. These circuits exhibit important types of behaviour that are fundamental to analogue electronics. In particular, they are able to act as passive filters. 

In practice, however, capacitors (and RC circuits) are usually preferred to inductors since they can be more easily manufactured and are generally physically smaller, particularly for higher values of components.

Both RC and RL circuits form a single-pole filter. Depending on whether the reactive element (C or L) is in series with the load, or parallel with the load will dictate whether the filter is low-pass or high-pass.

Frequently RL circuits are used as DC power supplies for RF amplifiers, where the inductor is used to pass DC bias current and block the RF getting back into the power supply.

Complex impedance 
The complex impedance  (in ohms) of an inductor with inductance  (in henrys) is 

The complex frequency  is a complex number,

where

  represents the imaginary unit: ,
  is the exponential decay constant (in radians per second), and
  is the angular frequency (in radians per second).

Eigenfunctions
The complex-valued eigenfunctions of any linear time-invariant (LTI) system are of the following forms:

From Euler's formula, the real-part of these eigenfunctions are exponentially-decaying sinusoids:

Sinusoidal steady state
Sinusoidal steady state is a special case in which the input voltage consists of a pure sinusoid (with no exponential decay). As a result,

and the evaluation of  becomes

Series circuit

By viewing the circuit as a voltage divider, we see that the voltage across the inductor is:

and the voltage across the resistor is:

Current
The current in the circuit is the same everywhere since the circuit is in series:

Transfer functions
The transfer function to the inductor voltage is

Similarly, the transfer function to the resistor voltage is

The transfer function, to the current, is

Poles and zeros
The transfer functions have a single pole located at

In addition, the transfer function for the inductor has a zero located at the origin.

Gain and phase angle
The gains across the two components are found by taking the magnitudes of the above expressions:

and

and the phase angles are:

and

Phasor notation
These expressions together may be substituted into the usual expression for the phasor representing the output:

Impulse response
The impulse response for each voltage is the inverse Laplace transform of the corresponding transfer function. It represents the response of the circuit to an input voltage consisting of an impulse or Dirac delta function.

The impulse response for the inductor voltage is

Similarly, the impulse response for the resistor voltage is

Zero-input response 
The zero-input response (ZIR), also called the natural response, of an RL circuit describes the behavior of the circuit after it has reached constant voltages and currents and is disconnected from any power source. It is called the zero-input response because it requires no input.

The ZIR of an RL circuit is:

Frequency domain considerations
These are frequency domain expressions. Analysis of them will show which frequencies the circuits (or filters) pass and reject. This analysis rests on a consideration of what happens to these gains as the frequency becomes very large and very small.

As :

As :

This shows that, if the output is taken across the inductor, high frequencies are passed and low frequencies are attenuated (rejected). Thus, the circuit behaves as a high-pass filter. If, though, the output is taken across the resistor, high frequencies are rejected and low frequencies are passed. In this configuration, the circuit behaves as a low-pass filter. Compare this with the behaviour of the resistor output in an RC circuit, where the reverse is the case.

The range of frequencies that the filter passes is called its bandwidth. The point at which the filter attenuates the signal to half its unfiltered power is termed its cutoff frequency. This requires that the gain of the circuit be reduced to 

Solving the above equation yields

which is the frequency that the filter will attenuate to half its original power.

Clearly, the phases also depend on frequency, although this effect is less interesting generally than the gain variations.

As :

As :

So at DC (0 Hz), the resistor voltage is in phase with the signal voltage while the inductor voltage leads it by 90°. As frequency increases, the resistor voltage comes to have a 90° lag relative to the signal and the inductor voltage comes to be in-phase with the signal.

Time domain considerations

This effectively transforms . Assuming a step input (i.e.,  before  and then  afterwards):

Partial fractions expansions and the inverse Laplace transform yield:

Thus, the voltage across the inductor tends towards 0 as time passes, while the voltage across the resistor tends towards , as shown in the figures. This is in keeping with the intuitive point that the inductor will only have a voltage across as long as the current in the circuit is changing — as the circuit reaches its steady-state, there is no further current change and ultimately no inductor voltage.

These equations show that a series RL circuit has a time constant, usually denoted  being the time it takes the voltage across the component to either fall (across the inductor) or rise (across the resistor) to within  of its final value.

Kirchhoff's voltage law implies that the voltage across the resistor will rise at the same rate. Note that the current, in the circuit behaves as the voltage across the resistor does, via Ohm's Law.

The delay in the rise or fall time of the circuit is in this case caused by the back-EMF from the inductor which, as the current flowing through it tries to change, prevents the current (and hence the voltage across the resistor) from rising or falling much faster than the time-constant of the circuit. Since all wires have some self-inductance and resistance, all circuits have a time constant. As a result, when the power supply is switched on, the current does not instantaneously reach its steady-state value, . The rise instead takes several time-constants to complete. If this were not the case, and the current were to reach steady-state immediately, extremely strong inductive electric fields would be generated by the sharp change in the magnetic field — this would lead to breakdown of the air in the circuit and electric arcing, probably damaging components (and users).

These results may also be derived by solving the differential equation describing the circuit:

The first equation is solved by using an integrating factor and yields the current which must be differentiated to give ; the second equation is straightforward. The solutions are exactly the same as those obtained via Laplace transforms.

Short circuit equation

For short circuit evaluation, RL circuit is considered. The more general equation is:

With initial condition:

Which can be solved by Laplace transform:

Thus:

Then antitransform returns:

In case the source voltage is a Heaviside step function (DC):

Returns:

In case the source voltage is a sinusoidal function (AC):

Returns:

Parallel circuit

When both the resistor and the inductor are connected in parallel connection and supplied through a voltage source, this is known as a RL parallel circuit. The parallel RL circuit is generally of less interest than the series circuit unless fed by a current source. This is largely because the output voltage is equal to the input voltage; as a result, this circuit does not act as a filter for a voltage input signal.

With complex impedances:

This shows that the inductor lags the resistor (and source) current by 90°.

The parallel circuit is seen on the output of many amplifier circuits, and is used to isolate the amplifier from capacitive loading effects at high frequencies. Because of the phase shift introduced by capacitance, some amplifiers become unstable at very high frequencies, and tend to oscillate. This affects sound quality and component life, especially the transistors.

See also 
 LC circuit
 RC circuit
 RLC circuit
 Electrical network
 List of electronics topics

References 

Analog circuits
Electronic filter topology